Yousra Matine (born 6 April 1996) is a Moroccan snooker player. She won the Women's Individual Snooker gold medal at the 2019 African Games. There were four entries in the women's individual snooker event. Matine beat Hakima Kissai 3–0, Yara Sharafeldin 2–1 and Gantan Elaskary 2–0. This was the first time that snooker had been included as an event in the African Games.

Matine was taught to play snooker by her fiancé Amine Amiri in 2016.

References

Living people
1996 births
Female snooker players
Place of birth missing (living people)
African Games gold medalists for Morocco
African Games silver medalists for Morocco
Competitors at the 2019 African Games
20th-century Moroccan women
21st-century Moroccan women